Patrick Blondeau (born 27 January 1968) is a French former professional footballer who played in Ligue 1 and the Premier League. He also made two appearances for the France national team.

Career
Born in Marseille, Blondeau began playing professional football with nearby FC Martigues in Ligue 2. He played for Jean Tigana for several years at AS Monaco. He was a key part of the side that won the 1996-97 Ligue 1 title.

For the 1997–98 season Blondeau signed with Sheffield Wednesday F.C. for a transfer fee of £1.8 million. He did not settle in Sheffield and returned to France in January 1998.

Blondeau captained his local club, Olympique de Marseille, for three seasons in the prime of his career, and was in the side that lost 3–0 to Parma in the 1998–99 UEFA Cup final. During his time at Marseille, he made a violent tackle on Yves Deroff, who suffered a double-broken leg, in a league match against FC Nantes on 29 May 1999. Blondeau received only a yellow card during the match, but the league later suspended him for six matches.

Personal life
Blondeau was married to fashion designer Véronika Loubry until 2016. They have two children: a daughter, model Thylane Blondeau (born 5 April 2001); and a son, Ayrton Blondeau (born 20 May 2007).

References

External links
 
 
 

1968 births
Living people
Footballers from Marseille
Association football defenders
French footballers
France international footballers
FC Martigues players
AS Monaco FC players
Sheffield Wednesday F.C. players
FC Girondins de Bordeaux players
Olympique de Marseille players
Watford F.C. players
US Créteil-Lusitanos players
Premier League players
Ligue 1 players
French expatriate footballers
Expatriate footballers in England